Ga-Madiba is a large village in the Mogalakwena Local Municipality of the Waterberg District Municipality of the Limpopo province in South Africa. It's located just 8 km north of the town of Mokopane on the N11 road.

Schools

Primary
Lešoba.
Kgatabela.

Secondary
Ntata.
Ntata.

References

Populated places in the Mogalakwena Local Municipality